Austin Tindle is an American voice actor who works for Funimation and Sentai Filmworks. He is best known for voicing the lead role of Ken Kaneki in the Tokyo Ghoul series, Kiyoshi Fujino in Prison School, Ayumu Aikawa in Is This a Zombie?, Yu Ishigami in Kaguya-sama: Love is War, Accelerator in the A Certain Magical Index series, as well as its spinoffs A Certain Scientific Accelerator and A Certain Scientific Railgun S, Karma Akabane in Assassination Classroom, Shu Ouma in Guilty Crown, Tsukasa Yugi Toilet-Bound Hanako-kun, Vali Lucifer in High School DxD, Marco Bodt in Attack on Titan, Neito Monoma in My Hero Academia, Kenji Kazama in D-Frag!, Crowley Eusford in Seraph of the End and Leopold Vermillion in Black Clover.

English dubbing roles

Anime

Film

Video games

References

External links

 
 Austin Tindle at Kim Dawson Talent
 Austin Tindle at Behind the Voice Actor

Living people
American male voice actors
21st-century American male actors
American male television actors
American male video game actors
Year of birth missing (living people)
American male film actors
Male actors from Dallas
Male actors from Orlando, Florida
University of Texas at Dallas alumni
Male actors from Austin, Texas